Paul Nicholas Sussman (11 July 1966 in Beaconsfield – 31 May 2012) was a best-selling English author, archaeologist and journalist. His novels were described by The Independent as "the intelligent reader's answer to The Da Vinci Code".

Biography
Paul Sussman was the only son of Stanley, a sales manager for a textile manufacturer, and Sue, an actress-turned-psychoanalyst. After a few years in Hampstead the family moved to Northwood in north-west London. He was educated at Merchant Taylors' School and St. John's College, Cambridge, where he won a Joseph Larmor Award and a boxing blue and was lead singer in a college band, Dr and the Glasscocks. His novels have been translated into 33 languages  and are set mainly in Egypt, where he worked for many years as a field archaeologist, notably with the Amarna Royal Tombs Project in the Valley of the Kings.

Among other finds, at Tomb KV56, in the Valley of the Kings, he unearthed the first items of pharaonic jewellery to have been excavated in the Valley since the discovery of Tutankhamun in 1922. As a journalist, he was a long-time contributor to The Big Issue, where he won a Periodical Publishers Association Columnist of the Year Award for his satirical "In The News" column. He also wrote for, among others,  The Independent, The Guardian, The Evening Standard, The Daily Telegraph, The Spectator, Cosmopolitan and CNN.com.

Death
On 31 May 2012, Sussman died suddenly after suffering a ruptured aneurysm. He was survived by his wife and two sons.

Books

Fiction
 The Lost Army of Cambyses (2002)
 The Last Secret of the Temple (2005)
 The Hidden Oasis (2009)
 The Labyrinth of Osiris (June 2012)
   The Final Testimony of Raphael Ignatius Phoenix  (2014)

Non-fiction
 The Ultimate Encyclopaedia of the Movies (1994) (contributor)
 Death by Spaghetti...: Bizarre, Baffling and Bonkers True: Stories from In The News (1996)

References

External links
 Paul Sussman official website
 Paul Sussman at Fantastic Fiction
 Nicholas Reeves, Re-excavating ‘The Gold Tomb’. Text of a lecture delivered at the day school "Valley of the Kings: The Amarna Royal Tombs Project 1998-2001", 29 September 2001, at the UCL Bloomsbury Theatre, London.

Alumni of St John's College, Cambridge
English archaeologists
20th-century English male writers
21st-century English male writers
English crime fiction writers
English Egyptologists
English male journalists
People educated at Merchant Taylors' School, Northwood
People from Beaconsfield
1966 births
2012 deaths